A trade mandate is a restriction in which one country will only buy goods if a certain standard is met or conditions are followed.  It grants special support to one country over another more than just a simple trade preference.  It functions in a similar way to a  trade prohibition, without actually formally being one.

See also
Trade preference
Trade prohibition
Trade sanctions
National treatment
Most favored nation

Commercial policy